Linda Thompson may refer to:

 Linda Thompson (singer) (born 1947), British folk singer
 Linda G. Thompson, (born 1948), member of the German band Silver Convention, and also a solo performer
 Linda Thompson (actress) (born 1950), American actress and songwriter
 Linda Thompson (attorney) (born 1953), Indiana attorney known for her conspiracy theories surrounding Waco Siege and Bill Clinton
 Linda D. Thompson (born c. 1961), former mayor of Harrisburg, Pennsylvania
 Linda Thompson (artistic director), Australian operatic soprano, producer and stage director

See also
Linda Chavez-Thompson (born 1944), executive vice-president of the AFL-CIO  
Linda Chatman Thomsen, U.S. Securities and Exchange Commission official